The Bubastite Portal gate is located in Karnak, within the Precinct of Amun-Re temple complex, between the temple of Ramesses III and the second pylon. It records the conquests and military campaigns in c.925 BC of Shoshenq I, of the Twenty-second Dynasty. Shoshenq has been identified with the biblical Shishaq, such that the relief is also known as the Shishak Inscription or Shishaq Relief.

History

This gate was erected by the kings of the Twenty-second Dynasty of Egypt, also known as the "Bubastite Dynasty". It is located to the south-east side of the Temple of Ramesses III.

Although Karnak had been known to Europeans since the end of the Middle Ages, the possible significance of the Bubastite Portal was not apparent prior to the decipherment of hieroglyphs. Jean-François Champollion visited Karnak in 1828, six years after his publication of the Rosetta Stone translation. In his letters he wrote:

Description

One facade shows King Sheshonq I, Teklot and Osorkon of the 22nd dynasty, making offerings to the gods and goddesses. Another scene shows Sheshonq grasping a group of captives by the hair and smiting them by his mace. Behind and below him, there are the names of Canaanite towns in several rows. Many of these are lost, but originally there were 156 names and one of the most interesting names which were mentioned is 'The Field of Abram' . The inscriptions give no details for this expedition and mentioned only the victory over the Asiatics.

Transliterations and translations
Below is a translation of the one hundred fifty-five names on the inscription.

Section One
Row I - Listing of the Nine bows
1. tꜣ rsy - Southern Land (i.e. Upper Egypt) 
2. tꜣ mḥw = Northern Land (i.e. Lower Egypt) 
3. jwn.tjw = Tribesmen 
4. ṯhnw = Tjehenu 
5. sḫt[-jꜣmw] - Field [of tents]
6. mn[.tjw] = Bedouin 
7. pḏ[.tjw swt] = Bow[men of the feather] 
8. šꜣt = Swamp (Upper Nubia) 
9. ḥꜣ[.w-n]b.w = Northerners

Section Two - Coastal plain, Shephelah, Meggido plain and Jezreel plain
10. mj.tj ꜥ[r.t] = Copy of the [scroll]
11. g[...] = unknown
12. m[]ꜣ[] = Makkedah
13. rwbꜣ = Rubate

Row II
14. tꜣꜥnkj = Taanach
15. šꜣnmꜥ = Shunem
16. bꜣtšꜣn swr = Beth-Shean
17. rwꜣḫbꜣ = Rehob
18. ꜣḫpwrwm = Hapharaim
19. jdrw[m] = Adoraim (unknown locality in Israelite Kingdom, different from Adoraim in Judah) 
20. (destroyed)
21. šꜣꜣwꜣd = unknown
22. mjꜣḥꜣnjmꜥ - Mahanaim
23. qbꜣꜥꜣnꜣ = Gibeon
24. bꜣtꜣḥwꜣrwn = Beth-Horon
25. qꜣdṯm = Kiriath-jearim or Gath-Gittaim
26. jywrwn = Aijalon

Row III
27. mjkdjw = Megiddo
28. jdrw = (Ataroth-)Addar
29. ywd-hꜥmrwk = Yad Hammelek ("hand of the king")
30. []rwt = unknown
31. ḥꜣjꜣnm = Henam
32. ꜥꜣrn = Aruna
33. bꜣrwmꜣꜥ = Borim
34. ḏꜣdpṯrw = Giti-Padalla
35. y[]hꜣ[]mꜣ = Yehem
36. bꜣtꜥꜣrwmmꜣ = Beth 'Olam
37. kꜣꜥqꜣrw = unknown
38. šꜣjwkꜣ = Socoh
39. bꜣttꜣpw = Beth-Tappuah

Row IV
40. jbꜣrjꜣ = unknown
41. [...]ḥtp = unknown
42. (destroyed)
43. (destroyed)
44. (destroyed)
45. bꜣtḏb[...] = unknown
46. nbk[...] = unknown
47. [...]i[...] = unknown
48. (destroyed)
49. (destroyed)
50. (destroyed)
51. [...]ssḏ[...] = unknown
52. (destroyed)

Row V
53. [p]nwjrw = Penuel
54. ꜣḥꜣdšꜣt = Hadashah?
55. pktṯ / pꜣ-wr-ktṯ = unknown / "The great ktṯ"
56. jdmjꜣ = Adam
57. ḏꜣ[m]rwmmꜣ = Zemaraim
58. [...]drw = Migdol
59. [...]rwḏꜣjꜣ = Tirzah
60. [...]nꜣrw = unknown
61. [...]j = unknown
62. (destroyed) 
63. (destroyed) 
64. [...]gꜣpn = unknown 
65. pꜣ-ꜥmq = "The valley"

Section Three - Negev area
Row VI
66. ꜥꜣjꜣḏꜣj = Ezem
67. jnꜣrw = unknown
68. pꜣ ꜣḥqꜣrwj = "the fort"
69. ftjywšꜣj = Photis
70. jrhrwrw = Jehallel / El-Hallal
71. pꜣ ꜣḥqꜣrwj = "the fort"
72. mrbꜣrmj = unknown
73. šꜣbꜣrwṯ = "stream"
74. ngbꜣrwy = of (Ezion-)Geber
75. šꜣbꜣrwṯ = "stream"
76. wꜣꜣrkytj = unknown
77. pꜣ ꜣḥqꜣrwj = "the fort"
78. nꜥḏꜣytj = unknown
79. dd[ ]j = unknown
80. ḏꜣpꜣqj = Sapek
81. mj[]j[] = unknown
82. tꜣp[...] = unknown

Row VII
83. gꜣnꜣt = unknown 
84. pꜣ nꜣgbw = "The Negev"
85. ꜥꜣḏꜣḥꜥṯ = unknown
86. tꜣšdnꜣw = unknown
87. pꜣ ꜣḥqꜣrw[t] = "the fort"
88. šꜣnꜣyj = unknown
89. hꜣqꜣ = unknown
90. pꜣ ng[bw] = "The Neg[ev]"
91. wꜣhṯrwwꜣk[...] = unknown
92. pꜣ nꜣgbw = "The Negev"
93. jšꜣḥtjw[t] = Shuhah?
94. pꜣ ꜣḥgrwj = "the fort"
95. ꜣḥꜣnnj = (Ben-)Hanan
96. pꜣ ꜣḥgrwj = "the fort"
97. jrwqꜣd = El-Gad 
98. jdꜣmꜣmt = unknown
99. ꜣḥꜣnꜣny = (Ben-)Hanan

Row VIII
100. jdrj = Adar
101. pꜣ ꜣḥgrw = "the fort"
102. [ṯrwꜣ]ꜣn = Tilon?
103. ꜣḥydbsꜣ = "Highlands"?
104. šꜣrwnrwjm = Shaaraim
105. []y[...] = "Highlands"?
106. dwꜣꜣṯ = unknown
107. ꜣḥqrwjm = "forts"
108. ꜥꜣrwdjꜣt = Arad
109. [rwbꜣṯ] = "Great"
110. ꜥꜣrwdjt = Arad (Tel Malhata?)
111. nbꜣpꜣttṯ = unknown
112. yꜣrẖjm = Yeroham
113. [...]j = unknown
114. (destroyed) 
115. (destroyed)  
116. jd[...] = unknown

Row IX
117. [jdr...] = Adar
118. [...bꜣyj] = unknown
119. [...ḥgj]  = unknown
120. []ꜣrywk = unknown
121. frwtjmjj = Peleth?
122. [ꜥ]tbꜣr = unknown
123. bpꜣjrwrḏꜣ = unknown
124. bꜣṯꜥnṯ = Beth-Anath 
125. šꜣrꜣḥꜣn = Sharuhen  
126. jrmꜥṯn = El-mattan 
127. grwn = "threshing floor"?
128. jdꜣmꜣm = unknown
129. [...]rꜣḥṯ = unknown
130. [...]r = unknown 
131. mꜥrw[...] = unknown
132. jrwr[...] = unknown
133. ywrwꜣ[...] = Yurza

Row X
134. (destroyed) 
135. (destroyed)  
136. (destroyed)  
137. (destroyed)  
138. (destroyed)  
139. ywrḥm = Yehoram 
140. jwnn = Onam
141. (destroyed)  
142. ꜣg[...] = Unknown 
143. (destroyed)  
144. (destroyed)  
145. mꜥ[...] = unknown
146. j[]d[...] = unknown 
147. (destroyed) 
148. (destroyed) 
149. [...]ꜣ = unknown
150. ywrwdn = uncertain

Row X extension
1a. šꜣrwdd = unknown
2a. rpꜣḥ = Raphiah  
3a. rwbn = Laban
4a. ꜥngrwn = unknown
5a. hꜣm = unknown

Biblical narrative
The Biblical narrative recounts:

 In the fifth year of King Rehoboam, because they had been unfaithful to the LORD, Shishaq king of Egypt came up against Jerusalem with 1,200 chariots and 60,000 horsemen. And the people were without number who came with him from Egypt— Libyans, Sukkiim, and Ethiopians. And he took the fortified cities of Judah and came as far as Jerusalem. Then Shemaiah the prophet came to Rehoboam and to the princes of Judah, who had gathered at Jerusalem because of Shishak, and said to them, "Thus says the LORD, 'You abandoned me, so I have abandoned you to the hand of Shishaq.'" Then the princes of Israel and the king humbled themselves and said, "The LORD is righteous." When the LORD saw that they humbled themselves, the word of the LORD came to Shemaiah: "They have humbled themselves. I will not destroy them, but I will grant them some deliverance, and my wrath shall not be poured out on Jerusalem by the hand of Shishaq. Nevertheless, they shall be servants to him, that they may know my service and the service of the kingdoms of the countries."
So Shishaq king of Egypt came up against Jerusalem. He took away the treasures of the house of the LORD and the treasures of the king’s house. He took away everything. He also took away the shields of gold that Solomon had made, and King Rehoboam made in their place shields of bronze and committed them to the hands of the officers of the guard, who kept the door of the king’s house. And as often as the king went into the house of the LORD, the guard came and carried them and brought them back to the guardroom. And when he humbled himself the wrath of the LORD turned from him, so as not to make a complete destruction. Moreover, conditions were good in Judah.

The account of Shishak carrying off treasures from Jerusalem is thought by some scholars to be of dubious historicity; see .

See also
List of artifacts significant to the Bible

References

External links
Kevin A. Wilson....... The Campaign Of Pharaoh Shoshenq I Into Palestine 
 University of Chicago Oriental Institute Epigraphic Survey (1954), Reliefs and inscriptions at Karnak: The Bubastite portal, vol. III. Chicago: University of Chicago Press.

10th century BC in Egypt
Buildings and structures completed in the 10th century BC
10th-century BC inscriptions
Gates in Egypt
Karnak temple complex
Shoshenq I